This is a list of episodes for the stop-motion television series Robot Chicken. The first episode aired on February 20, 2005, at 11:30 p.m. EST on Cartoon Network's Adult Swim block, and the eleventh season premiered on September 7, 2021, at 12:00 a.m. EDT. There have been a number of half-hour specials.

Series overview

Episodes

Season 1 (2005)

Season 2 (2006)

Season 3 (2007–08)

Season 4 (2008–09)

Season 5 (2010–12)

Season 6 (2012–13)

Season 7 (2014)

Season 8 (2015–16)

Season 9 (2017–18)

Season 10 (2019–20)

Season 11 (2021–22)

Specials

References

External links 
 Adult Swim's Robot Chicken website
 List of 

Robot Chicken episodes
Lists of American adult animated television series episodes
Lists of American comedy television series episodes